Jimmy G. Cheek is Chancellor Emeritus and Distinguished Professor Emeritus of Higher Education in Department of Educational Leadership and Policy Studies at The University of Tennessee, Knoxville (UTK) and Former Director of the Postsecondary Education Research Center. He is also Professor Emeritus at the University of Florida.  As the state's flagship research campus, UT Knoxville is currently ranked as a Top 50 public institution.

Cheek became the seventh chancellor of the University of Tennessee, Knoxville in February 2009, and stepped down from that position in 2017 and joined the faculty of the Department of Educational Leadership and Policy Studies. He retired from the University of Tennessee in November 2022.

Career 
During his time as chancellor, the university invested more than $1 billion in new facilities, increased enrollment and retention, opened several research centers, named the colleges of business and engineering, and was designated a Carnegie Engaged University.

Cheek's primary goals upon taking the position as chancellor of UTK were to improve the academic experience of students and advance faculty teaching, research and scholarship. His ultimate goal was to help Tennessee become one of the top 25 research universities in the United States.

Cheek pursued the following goals to help UTK achieve a top 25 ranking among all public universities:

·       Attract, retain, and graduate a diverse body of well-educated undergraduate and graduate students

·       Increase the number of students enrolled while improving the quality

·       Enhance the educational experiences for graduate and undergraduate students

·       Strengthen capacity and productivity in research, scholarship, & creative activity

·       Attract and retain stellar and diverse faculty and staff

·       Continually improve the resource base and improve campus infrastructure

·       Strengthen and build collaborative relationships

Major accomplishments include approval by the Board of Trustees of differential tuition for 4 colleges, the 15-4 tuition model where full-time undergraduates pay for 15 credit hours each semester, and approval of a transformational campus infrastructure and landscaping plan. In 2012 the campus launched a private fund-raising campaign, Join the Journey, with a goal to raise $1.1 billion by 2020 and raised about $1.3 billion.  A new student union, classroom, laboratory, and research facilities were constructed as well as four new residence halls.

Numerous changes in the university's delivery of core services including advising, tutoring, mentoring, admissions, and other support to help students graduate on time and achieve their academic goals. These changes dramatically increased enrollment, retention and graduation rates and brought UTK's metrics closer to aspirant peers.  The increased commitment to faculty and staff salaries aided recruitment and retention of world-class faculty and staff.  Relationships with existing partners, such as Oak Ridge National Laboratory and Eastman Chemical were enhanced, and new relationships were developed with others such as Volkswagen.  These partnerships broaden research and provide opportunities for collaboration with faculty and students.

Cheek served as the Senior Vice President for Agriculture and Natural Resources at the University of Florida from 2005 to 2009.  As senior vice president, Cheek was head of the University of Florida's Institute of Food and Agricultural Sciences (IFAS), which includes the College of Agricultural and Life Sciences, the School of Natural Resources and the Environment, the School of Forest Resources and Conservation, the College of Veterinary Medicine, the Florida Agricultural Experiment Station, 13 research and education centers, and the Florida Cooperative Extension Service, with offices in each of the state's 67 counties.

During his tenure, grant and contract expenditures increased 30%, private fund raising increased by 76%, and county funding for Extension increased 34%.  Significant new funding was allocated by the Legislature and approved by the Governor including $20 million for a cellulosic ethanol research plant to utilize and further develop technology patented by IFAS faculty.  The faculty and student body became more diverse.  IFAS faculty and administrators slayed pivotal roles in developing several university interdisciplinary strategic initiatives including creating the Water Institute, the Genetics Institute and building, and the Emerging Pathogens Institute (EPI) and building.  The EPI received special funding from the legislature of over $100 million and is unique in that it focuses on human, animal, and plant pathogens.

Cheek served as Dean of the College of Agricultural and Life Sciences (CALS) at the University of Florida, the fourth largest college at the university, from 1999 to 2005.. As dean, Cheek oversaw the development of four new degree programs and eleven undergraduate minors.  CALS received $6.1 million of new resources based on graduate enrollment growth using a competitive, performance-based model.  Student credit hours increased 43% at the graduate level and 19% at the undergraduate level.   The Annual Teaching Enhancement Symposium and IFAS Graduate Student Research Symposium were implemented, and funding was secured for off-campus Research and Education Centers and a regional Community College.  In 2005, IFAS received $3.5 million in new resources for graduate education support and 6 million in endowments for the college.  IFAS was successful under the leadership of Cheek in receiving $5.7 million in recurring funds and $16.4 million in non-recurring funds in 2006 and approximately $24 million in 2007.

Cheek became Assistant Dean of the college in 1992 and served in that role 7 years prior to becoming Dean.  During his tenure, undergraduate enrollment increased 120%, the number of degrees conferred doubled, early admission programs with the College of Dentistry and the College of Veterinary Medicine were launched, and an off-campus program was initiated at Milton.  Under his leadership, the college core academic requirements were revised along with the curriculum of each major in the college, three majors and an interdisciplinary minor were established, and an upper-division honors program was developed and implemented.

Cheek was hired at the University of Florida in 1975 as an assistant professor of Agricultural Education and Communication and became Professor in 1985.  In 1981, he was appointed Assistant Department Chair and served in that role until 1992.

Education 
Cheek holds a Ph.D. in Interdisciplinary Education and a bachelor's degree with high honors in Agricultural Education from Texas A&M University. He received his master's degree in Guidance and Counseling from Lamar University.

Awards and Recognitions 
The Board of Trustees of the University of Tennessee System honored him for his work as Chancellor with a resolution commending him for his outstanding service to the board, university, and state.  He received the Leadership and Service Award from the Alumni Board of Directors, a Faculty Senate Resolution honoring his significant and lasting contributions, a Thomas Jefferson Cup for his support and dedication from the Chancellor's Associates, and the Student Government Association created the Jimmy G. Cheek Visionary Award to annually recognize a visionary student leader.

Dr. Cheek has received Outstanding Alumni Awards from the College of Agriculture and Life Sciences and the College of Education and Human Development from Texas A&M University.  Tarleton State University awarded him the President's Legacy Award for Excellence Through Leadership.

While at the University of Florida, Cheek received the President's Medallion and Student Body Resolution 2009-104 for dedicated and loyal service to the university and outstanding service to students, respectively, and the Morton Wolfson Faculty Award for outstanding contributions to the quality of student life. Cheek was named to the Academy of Teaching Excellence in 2008 at the University of Florida, a Fellow of the American Association for Agricultural Education in 2005, and a Fellow of the North American Colleges and Teachers of Agriculture in 1998.

Professional Service 
Cheek currently serves on the United Way Tocqueville Cabinet, the Greater Knoxville Board of Directors, and  was the United Way of Greater Knoxville Campaign Chair in 2018.  He is a member of the Delaware Valley University Board of Trustees and past chair of the board of directors for the International Fertilizer Development Center (IFDC). Cheek was the chair of the Commission on Food, Environment and Renewable Resources, a member of its Energy Forum, a board member of the Association of Public and Land Grant Universities, and currently a commission member of the Association of Public and Land Grant Universities Food Systems Leadership Institute.

While Chancellor, Cheek served on the UT-Battelle Board of Governors for Oak Ridge National Laboratory, the board of directors for United Health System, the Pat Summit Foundation, the Southeastern Conference (SEC) Board of Directors, the SEC Executive Committee and chaired the Leadership Knoxville Board of Directors.

Personal life 
Cheek is a native of Texas and is married to Ileen Cheek, and they have two children and four grandchildren.

Publications 

 Cheek, J. G., & Arrington, L. R. (2011). Reshaping SAE to provide experiential learning in the 1990s. The Agricultural Education Magazine, 83(4), 5–8.
 Cheek, J. G. (2008). Ag Fuels Florida's Future. Florida Grower, 101(4), 34.
 Cheek, J. G. (2006). Safeguarding the future of Florida's citrus industry. Florida Grower, 22, 24.
 Darnell, R., & Cheek, J. (2005). Plant science graduate students: Demographics, research areas, and recruitment issues. HortScience, 40(4), 1138B-1138.
 Martin, M. V., & Cheek, J. G. (2004). Off-campus degree programs: lessons from Florida's experience. NACTA journal, 42–45.
 Connor, L. J., & Cheek, J. G. (2002). Effective utilization of faculty task forces for problem solving. NACTA Journal, 27–32.
 Achey, P. M., & Cheek, J. G. (1999). Alternative Approaches to Computerized Monitoring of Student Progress. NACTA journal, 24-28
 Comer, D. A., Cheek, J. G., & Connor, L. J. (1996). A case study of undergraduate curricular reform in a college of agriculture. NACTA Journal, 40(3), 4–13.
 Cheek, J. G., Arrington, L. R., & McGhee, M. B. (1995). Effective oral communication. Interstate Publishers.
 Cheek, J. G., Arrington, L. R., Carter, S., & Randell, R. S. (1994). Relationship of supervised agricultural experience program participation and student achievement in agricultural education. Journal of agricultural education, 35(2), 1–5.
 Arrington, L. R., & Cheek, J. G. (1990). SAE Scope and Student Achievement in Agribusiness and Natural Resources Education. Journal of Agricultural Education, 31(2), 55–61.
 Cheek, J. (1988). Maintaining Momentum in Vocational Education Research. Journal of Vocational Education Research, 13(1), 1–17.
 Cheek, J. G. (1983). Predicting Whether or Not Agricultural Education Graduates Will Teach. Journal of Vocational Education Research, 8(4), 49–60.
 Cheek, J. G., & Christiansen, J. E. (1977). Perceptions regarding the role of the vocational counselor. The Journal of Educational Research, 70(5), 281–285.

References 

University of Florida faculty
Texas A&M University alumni
Living people
Lamar University alumni
Leaders of the University of Tennessee Knoxville
1946 births